Eua montana is a species of tropical air-breathing land snail, a terrestrial pulmonate gastropod mollusk in the family Partulidae.

The following is a cladogram showing the phylogenic relations of Eua montana:

References

Partulidae
Gastropods described in 1930